Leoš Šimánek (born 19 April 1946) is a Czech traveler.

He was born in Choceň, Czechoslovakia (now the Czech Republic). He studied civil engineering and left communist Czechoslovakia in 1968. He settled in Germany where he worked in the construction industry. He was given German citizenship. Later, he also obtained Canadian citizenship. He returned to Czechoslovakia after the Velvet Revolution in 1990. He traveled all over the world since 1970s and wrote many books about his journeys.

References

External links
 

1946 births
Living people
Czechoslovak emigrants to Canada
Czechoslovak emigrants to Germany
Czechoslovak exiles
Czech explorers
Czech travel writers
People from Choceň